Shooting People is an international social network for independent filmmakers that was founded in 1998 by Cath Le Couteur and Jess Search, in which members share resources and knowledge to get their films made and seen.
Dedicated to the support and promotion of independent filmmaking, the company acts as an umbrella and partner for a variety of film organizations, publishing seven daily bulletins across all sectors of the industry.
Additional activities include hosting the Independent Film Calendar, regular panel discussions, screenings, a Mobile Cinema and publication of "The Shooting People Shorts Directory". In 2009 Shooting People launched "Film of the Month" where active patrons in the organisation watch and review films made by members. Patrons include Mike Figgis, Nick Cave, Michael Winterbottom, Matt Groening, Sally Potter, Asif Kapadia, Kevin Smith, Drake Doremus, John Waters, Christine Vachon, Werner Herzog, and Danny Boyle.

In 2010, the full list of films available on the International Space Station came to the attention of Shooting People. Concerned that the only off-world film library was consumed by mainstream American films, they conducted a poll and wrote to NASA with some more varied suggestions from members. NASA responded that individual films were selected by its crew members and that the list would be forwarded to the crew office.

Work 
Shooting People encourages and facilitates independent filmmaking through a range of services. Over 200 productions are cast and crewed every week through a production system that allows members to post and apply for projects and jobs. Directories dedicated to film financing, training and competitions are updated daily. Film forums for members to share their advice and expertise. Shooting People have also commissioned filmmakers for projects headed by Puma (Films for Peace), Bombay Sapphire and Channel 4 (Random Acts). Notable filmmakers have come through Shooting People, such as Oscar-nominated director Orlando von Einsiedel Virunga (film), Ainslie Henderson (BAFTA winning for The Making of Longbird), Jack Thorne (This Is England '86, This Is England '88, The Scouting Book for Boys).

Fee-Based Service 
In January 2001, a low subscription fee was introduced. The funding model worked and Shooting People has remained a subscription service, independently funded and supported by its members ever since. In 2003 they launched in NYC, where there are over 10,000 members.

Reception 
Shooting People emerged at a time when significant changes in Digital Cinematography made it easier to get films made. In 2002, The Times wrote: "Shooting People is helping to fuel a major grassroots revival in low-budget independent cinema."

References

External links 
 shootingpeople.org

Social networking websites
Film organisations in the United Kingdom